Jan Maurits Quinkhard (28 January 1688 – 11 November 1772) was an 18th-century painter and print designer from the Northern Netherlands.

Biography
Quinkhard was born in the town of Rees, near Cleves. He was a Dutch painter and scholar of his father, the painter Julius Quinkhardt the Elder, Arnold van Boonen, Christoffel Lubinietski, and Nikolaas Verkolje.

He painted familiar, allegorical, and mythological subjects, and was excellent in portraits, of which he painted a great number. Five good examples are in the Amsterdam Museum.

His son Julius (1736-1776) was instructed by his father, but abandoned art for commerce. Two pictures by him are in the Amsterdam Museum. He also collaborated with Jacobus Houbraken and other leading engravers on prints of the rich and famous of Amsterdam.

His pupils were:

Jurriaan Andriessen

Jan de Beijer

, his son
Tibout Regters

Adriaan Schregardus
Jan Stolker

Jan Gerard Waldorp. 

He died, aged 84, in Amsterdam.

Notes

References
Quinkhard, Jan Maurits at the Netherlands Institute for Art History.

Attribution:

External link

1688 births
1772 deaths
18th-century Dutch painters
18th-century Dutch male artists
Dutch male painters
People from Rees, Germany